Garijgan (also Romanized as Gārījgān, Gārījgān, Gārchgan, Gārejgān, and Gārijgān; also known as Mobārakābād) is a village in Jolgeh-e Mazhan Rural District, Jolgeh-e Mazhan District, Khusf County, South Khorasan Province, Iran. At the 2006 census, its population was 146, in 37 families.

References 

Populated places in Khusf County